Marta Zlatic (born 24 February 1977) is a Croatian neuroscientist who is group leader at the MRC Laboratory of Molecular Biology in Cambridge, UK. Her research investigates how neural circuits generate behaviour.

Early life and education 
Zlatic is from Zagreb, Croatia. She has said that growing up she had excellent Latin and Greek teachers. She was awarded a full scholarship to study the Natural Sciences Tripos at Trinity College, Cambridge. During her summer holidays from Cambridge, Zlatic studied linguistics and Russian at the University of Zagreb. Alongside her studies, Zlatic was involved with the Cambridge theatre scene, taking part in Greek tragedies and Shakespeare's plays. As an undergraduate student Zlatic attended the lectures of Mike Bate, where he discussed the neural circuits of fruit flies. She enjoyed the lectures so much that she applied for a postgraduate degree. During her doctoral research Zlatic looked at the development of neurons in Drosophila. As the nervous system starts to form, neurons start to produce axons and dendrites. Zlatic showed that sensory neurons, which allow for sight, sound, pain and touch, look for particular locations in the nervous system using positional cues.

Research and career 
After earning her doctorate, Zlatic was awarded a postdoctoral fellowship at the University of Cambridge which allowed her to travel internationally and study the assembly of neural circuits. In 2009 Zlatic started her independent career at the Janelia Research Campus. At Janelia she learnt about the genetic tools used to manipulate the types of neurons in Drosophila. Zlatic has dedicated her career to the study of the nervous system, in particular the positional cue known as the slit protein which controls how sensory neuron axons start and stop growing. She showed that slit proteins control branching along the mediolateral axis but not the dorsoventral axis, indicating that there are positional cues in three-dimensions.

Zlatic is interested the complex functions of the human brain, including language and communication. She has studied the brains of different species; including Drosophila and maggots. She made use of electron microscopy to map the entire Drosophila connectome, and studies the strengths of the connections between neurons that are structurally connected. By investigating the activity of these neurons it is possible to associate particular patterns with the formation of memories.

Awards and honours 

 2020: Elected to EMBO Membership by the European Molecular Biology Organization (EMBO).
 2020: Awarded the Crick Lecture by the Royal Society
 2017 Eric Kandel Young Neuroscientist Prize
 2004 Thomas Henry Huxley Award from the Zoological Society of London

Publications 
Her publications include:
 Labeling of active neural circuits in vivo with designed calcium integrators
 A multilevel multimodal circuit enhances action selection in Drosophila
 The complete connectome of a learning and memory centre in an insect brain

Personal life 
Zlatic is fluent in several languages, including Croatian, English, German, French, Russian, Spanish, Italian, Ancient Greek, and Latin. Alongside her enthusiasm for languages and neuroscience, Zlatic is an actress. She is married to neuroscientist .

References 

Living people
Croatian women academics
Scientists from Zagreb
Women neuroscientists
Academics of the University of Cambridge
University of Zagreb alumni
Croatian emigrants to the United States
1977 births